Kent Harrington is an American novelist most known for Dia de los Muertos (Day of the Dead), The American Boys, and The Tattooed Muse.

Background
Harrington's father was Irish-Jewish and his mother was Guatemalan. He attended the Palo Alto Military Academy and San Francisco State University, where he received a degree in Spanish literature. He lived in Spain and Latin America. Before becoming a novelist, he was a teacher, carpenter, factory worker and life insurance salesman.

Bibliography

References 

Living people
American male novelists
American expatriates in Spain
Writers from the San Francisco Bay Area
San Francisco State University alumni
20th-century American novelists
21st-century American novelists
American thriller writers
20th-century American male writers
21st-century American male writers
Year of birth missing (living people)